Mount Tenabo (Shoshoni: "Lookout Mountain") is the principal peak in the Cortez Mountains. The mountain is of cultural and religious significance to the Western Shoshone people.

Etymology
There are various theories as to the name's etymology. The mountain may have been named by New Mexicans after an ancient pueblo, or Tenabo may be a Paiute word, meaning of "dark colored water".

Geography
Its base is covered with scrub pine. Approximately  to the north is the Humboldt River and its valley. Eastward, there are hills and valleys. To the west is the Smoky Valley, Mount Hope, Bunker Hill, and other peaks of the Toiyabe Range.

This vein (stratum) contains ore beds, and is encased in crystalline limestone.

History
Silver ore was discovered at Mount Tenabo in 1862 by a group of New Mexicans. By the later half of the 1860s, there were at least 20 working mills. In 2008, the Te-Moak tribe, the Timbisha tribe and others sought an emergency injunction that would have halted further development of Barrick Gold's Cortez Hills mining operation which includes facilities on the slopes of Mount Tenabo. As of July 2016, mining continues while the BLM prepares a court-ordered supplemental environmental impact statement.

References

Landforms of Eureka County, Nevada
Tenabo